Manish Raj Pandey (born 5 December 1970) is a former Nepalese cricketer. All-rounder Pandey played as a right-handed opening batsman and a right-arm medium-fast bowler. He made his debut for Nepal against Bangladesh in September 1996.

Playing career 
Born in Biratnagar, Pandey actively participated in national level cricket championships as a regular player representing Koshi zone and Morang district from 1988 to 2000. He also successfully led Morang district and Youth Cricket Club, Biratnagar teams as a captain.

Pandey was one of the eleven cricketers to play in Nepal's first ever official international cricket match during the 1996 Asian Cricket Council (ACC) Trophy in Kuala Lumpur, against Bangladesh, on 6 September 1996. Nepal finished fourth out of six teams in their first round group in this competition, beating Japan and Brunei. Pandey, with his opening partner Pawan Agarwal at the other end, faced Nepal's first ever delivery in international cricket. He took one wicket, returning figures of 1/31 in 8 overs in his debut match and scored 13 runs including the first ever six hit by a Nepalese batsman, with a flick over deep backward square leg.

Pandey became the first ever Nepalese cricketer to receive a player of the match award in an international cricket match, when he hit 27 runs and took 1 wicket against Japan on 7 September 1996. His best bowling performance was 3/22 against Brunei on 11 September 1996. He took 5 wickets during the 1996 ACC Trophy.

Pandey currently serves as the president of the Cricket Players' Association Nepal (CPAN) since 2018. He also holds a Ph.D. degree in Natural Science.

References 

Pandey, Manish Raj

Pandey, Manish Raj
Pandey, Manish Raj
Pandey, Manish Raj